Gilkeson is a surname.  Notable people with the surname include:

 Adlai H. Gilkeson (1893–1959), United States Air Force general
 Henry Bell Gilkeson (1850–1921), American lawyer, politician, school administrator, and banker

See also
 Gilkerson (disambiguation)

English-language surnames